State of Exception may mean:

 State of exception, a legal theory about transcending the rule of law for the public good
 State of Exception (2005), a book written by Giorgio Agamben describing the above theory

See also 
 State of emergency, a related concept
 Exceptionalism, a political philosophy concept